The Isaac Gardner Sr. House (also known as the Gardner Family House) is a historic home in Tampa, Florida, United States. It is located at 209 West Palm Avenue. On October 13, 2003, it was added to the U.S. National Register of Historic Places.

References

 Hillsborough County listings at National Register of Historic Places

Houses in Tampa, Florida
Houses on the National Register of Historic Places in Hillsborough County, Florida
1924 establishments in Florida